The 16th Infantry Division was a formation of the Ottoman Turkish Army during the Balkan Wars and the First World War.

Formation
33rd Infantry Regiment
47th Infantry Regiment
48th Infantry Regiment
125th Infantry Regiment

References

 Bean, Charles (1941). Official History of Australia in the War of 1914–1918. Volume II (11th ed.). Brisbane: University of Queensland Press. .

Military units and formations of the Ottoman Empire in the Balkan Wars
Military units and formations of the Ottoman Empire in World War I
Infantry divisions of the Ottoman Empire